The Demon's Forge is a 1981 video game published by Saber Software for the Apple II and IBM PC, designed by Brian Fargo.

Gameplay
The Demon's Forge is a game in which the player is a mercenary banished to a dungeon. The game is an interactive fiction adventure game that is text and image-based.

Reception
Michael Cranford, a co-developer, reviewed the game for Computer Gaming World, and stated that "I enjoyed The Demon's Forge and, on the whole, would recommend it to anyone."

References

External links
Review in Softalk
Article in Softline

1981 video games
Adventure games
Apple II games
Fantasy video games
Mastertronic games
Video games developed in the United States